The Forgotten Village is a 1941 American documentary film—some sources call it an ethnofiction film—directed by Herbert Kline and Alexander Hammid. The film was written by John Steinbeck,  narrated by Burgess Meredith, and with music by Hanns Eisler. The film was released by the film distribution partnership of Arthur Mayer & Joseph Burstyn.

The New York State Board of Regents, acting as the state's board of censors, banned the film in New York due to the film's portrayal of childbirth and showing a baby at its mother's breast.

The film depicts the conflicts between traditional life in a Mexican village, and outsiders who want to introduce modernization.

Cast
 Burgess Meredith – Narrator

Censorship
The Hays Office refused to approve the film. The distributors decided to release the film without the Hays Office's Seal of Approval. The New York State Board of Regents banned the film because of the inclusion of a lengthy childbirth scene. But the film’s distributor protested to the State Board of Regents who lifted the ban and allowed the uncut film to be shown in New York.

Restoration and re-release
A restored version of the film was released in 2011. The film was restored by the UCLA Film & Television Archive, funded by the Packard Humanities Institute.

The new print was made “from the original 35mm nitrate picture and soundtrack negatives from the Stanford Theatre Foundation Collection and a 35mm nitrate fine grain master positive from MOMA.”

The restoration premiered at the UCLA Festival of Preservation on March 14, 2011 and was screened at other North American cities in 2011 including  Vancouver.

See also
 List of films in the public domain in the United States

References

External links
 
 
 
 The Forgotten Village informational site at The Steinbeck Institute
 

1941 films
1941 documentary films
American documentary films
Black-and-white documentary films
Ethnofiction films
Films based on works by John Steinbeck
Films set in the 1940s
Social realism in film
Spanish-language American films
Films directed by Alexandr Hackenschmied
American black-and-white films
Films with screenplays by John Steinbeck
1940s English-language films
1940s American films